LaRon Byrd (born August 18, 1989) is a former American football wide receiver. After going undrafted in 2012, he was signed by the Arizona Cardinals. He has also been a member of the Dallas Cowboys, Cleveland Browns, Miami Dolphins, Atlanta Falcons, Washington Redskins, and Carolina Panthers. He played college football at Miami (FL).

Early years and high school
Byrd was considered the second-best receiver in Louisiana out of Hahnville High School. As a senior in 2007, caught 50 passes for 630 yards and 13 touchdowns. Byrd also played some safety, making three interceptions, in leading his team to a 10-3 record. As a junior in 2006, made 30 receptions for 447 yards and eight touchdowns. Byrd was ranked the No. 16 player in the state of Louisiana and was ranked the 60th wide receiver prospect in the nation by Rivals.com. Byrd was also ranked as the 69th wide receiver prospect by Scout.com.

College career
In 2008, Byrd played in all 13 games for the University of Miami and made three starts against Texas A&M, Georgia Tech, and NC State. He was the team's sixth-leading receiver with 21 receptions for 228 yards and three touchdowns. Byrd caught his first career-receiving touchdown on the road at Duke (a 10-yard reception). He had a career-high three receptions in the season opener against Charleston Southern, the regular season finale at NC State and against California in the Emerald Bowl.

Professional career

Arizona Cardinals
On April 30, 2012, after going undrafted, Byrd signed with the Arizona Cardinals. On August 6, 2013, Byrd was waived/injured by the Arizona Cardinals. He cleared waivers and was placed on the injured reserve list. On April 4, 2014, Byrd was released by the team.

Dallas Cowboys
On May 1, 2014, Byrd signed a two-year contract with the Dallas Cowboys. Byrd, who spent all of the 2014 offseason and camp with Dallas, was cut just before the start of the regular season.

Cleveland Browns
Byrd was claimed off waivers by the Cleveland Browns on August 31, 2014. He played in only one game and was released by the team on October 3, 2014 to make room for Rodney Smith.

Dallas Cowboys
On October 7, 2014, Byrd was re-signed by the Cowboys to their practice squad. To make room for Byrd, the Cowboys waived wide receiver Tim Benford, who was in his third season on the practice squad. On October 9, 2014, the Cowboys released Byrd from the practice squad to make room for wide receiver Kerry Taylor.

Miami Dolphins
On April 15, 2015, the Miami Dolphins signed Byrd to compete for the 5th wide receiver position. On August 30, 2015, he was released by the Dolphins.

Atlanta Falcons
On September 16, 2015, the Atlanta Falcons signed Byrd to their practice squad. He was released on November 3.

Washington Redskins
The Washington Redskins signed Byrd to their practice squad on November 9, 2015.

He signed a futures contract on January 11, 2016. He was released by the team on May 2.

Carolina Panthers
On May 20, 2016, Byrd signed with the Carolina Panthers. On August 30, 2016, Byrd was placed on injured reserve.

References

External links
 Miami Hurricanes bio
 Arizona Cardinals bio
 Dallas Cowboys bio

1989 births
Living people
People from Hahnville, Louisiana
Players of American football from Louisiana
American football wide receivers
Miami Hurricanes football players
Arizona Cardinals players
Dallas Cowboys players
Cleveland Browns players
Miami Dolphins players
Atlanta Falcons players
Washington Redskins players
Carolina Panthers players